Cristian Bunino (born 27 August 1996) is an Italian footballer who plays as a forward for  club Lecco on loan from Pro Vercelli.

Career

Pro Vercelli
Born in Pinerolo, in the Province of Turin (now part of the Metropolitan City of Turin), Piedmont, Bunino started his career at Piedmontese club Pro Vercelli. He made his Serie B debut in the last round of the 2012–13 Serie B season. Bunino was brought on for substitute Antonio Romano. Vercelli were relegated from Serie B that season, after finishing third from bottom in Group A of the Allievi league.

During the 2013–14 season, his team finished as the winners of Group A in the Berretti under-19 league. However, the team was eliminated by Südtirol in the first round of the play-offs.

Bunino played three more Serie B games for the first team in the first half of the 2014–15 Serie B season.

Juventus
On 2 February 2015, Turin-based Serie A giants Juventus, signed Bunino for €1.75 million on a -year contract in a straight swap deal involving: Luca Castiglia (for €1.5 million) plus Giuseppe Ruggiero (for €250,000). Bunino was immediately loaned back to Vercelli on a temporary deal for  seasons.

Pro Vercelli (loan)
Since returning to Pro Vercelli on 2 February 2015, Bunino made just a single appearance during the 2014–15 Serie B campaign. He scored 10 goals for the under-19 team that season, and was Pro Vercelli's top-scorer and ninth best in the Primavera under-19 league.

He played once for Pro Vercelli in the 2015–16 season in the Coppa Italia.

Livorno (loan)
On 31 August 2015, Bunino and Cristian Pasquato were signed by Serie B club Livorno on temporary deals, rejoining Juventus team-mate Carlo Pinsoglio and Andrea Schiavone. Pro Vercelli also acquired Fausto Rossi from Juventus as a replacement.

Siena (loan)
On 24 August 2016 Bunino was signed by Siena on a temporary deal.

Alessandria (loan)
On 8 August 2017 Bunino was signed by another Piedmontese club Alessandria on a temporary deal, with an option to buy. He was assigned number 27 shirt.

Pescara
On 31 January 2018 Bunino was signed by Pescara in a definitive deal, with Leonardo Mancuso moved to Juventus in the same formula. He was assigned number 11 shirt, which was owned by Francesco Zampano. On 9 August 2019 he joined Padova on loan with an option to purchase. On 10 January 2020 he moved on a new loan to Serie C club Viterbese. On 5 October 2020 he joined Teramo on loan. On 16 January 2021 he moved on a new loan to Monopoli.

Return to Pro Vercelli
On 30 July 2021, he returned to Pro Vercelli on Serie C. On 1 September 2022, Bunino was loaned by Fermana. On 31 January 2023, Bunino moved on a 1.5-year loan to Lecco.

References

External links
 
 AIC profile 

1996 births
People from Pinerolo
Footballers from Piedmont
Sportspeople from the Metropolitan City of Turin
Living people
Italian footballers
Italy youth international footballers
Association football forwards
Serie B players
Serie C players
F.C. Pro Vercelli 1892 players
Juventus F.C. players
U.S. Livorno 1915 players
A.C.N. Siena 1904 players
U.S. Alessandria Calcio 1912 players
Delfino Pescara 1936 players
Juventus Next Gen players
Calcio Padova players
U.S. Viterbese 1908 players
S.S. Teramo Calcio players
S.S. Monopoli 1966 players
Fermana F.C. players
Calcio Lecco 1912 players